Jérémy is a French masculine given name. It is a spelling variant of Jérémie, itself the French variant of the biblical name Jeremiah. Its cognate in English is Jeremy.

People with the given name Jérémy include:
 Jérémy Abadie (born 1988), a French football player
 Jérémy Acedo (born 1987), a French football player
 Jérémy Amelin (born 1986), a French electro recording artist and entertainer
 Jérémy Berthod (born 1984), a French football player
 Jérémy Blayac (born 1983), a French football player
 Jérémy Chardy (born 1987), a French professional tennis player
 Jérémy Chatelain (born 1984), a French singer, actor and fashion designer
 Jérémy Choplin (born 1985), a French professional football player
 Jérémy Clément (born 1984), a French professional football player
 Jérémy Cordoval (born 1990), a French professional football player
 Jérémy Deichelbohrer (born 1986), a French football player
 Jérémy De Magalhaes (born 1983), a French football player
 Jérémy Denquin (born 1977), a French professional football player
 Jérémy De Vriendt (born 1986), a Belgian football player
 Jérémy Faug-Porret (born 1987), a French football player
 Jérémy Florès (born 1988), a French surfer
 Jérémy Gabriel (born 1996), a Quebecer singer
 Jérémy Gavanon (born 1983), a French football player
 Jérémy Hélan (born 1992), a French football player
 Jérémy Henin (born 1977), a French professional football player
 Jérémy Huyghebaert (born 1989), a Belgian football player
 Jérémy Jaunin (born 1991), a Swiss basketball player
 Jérémy Kapone (born 1990), a French actor, singer and songwriter
 Jérémy Labor (born 1992), a French football player
 Jérémy Manière (born 1991), a Swiss football player
 Jérémy Mathieu (born 1983), a French football player
 Jérémy Ménez (born 1987), a French international football 
 Jérémy Messiba (born 1988), a French football player
 Jérémy Moreau (born 1980), a French professional football player
 Jérémy Morel (born 1984), a French professional football player
 Jérémy Obin (born 1993), a French football player
 Jérémy Perbet (born 1984), a French football player
 Jérémy Pied (born 1989), a French professional football player
 Jérémy Pinvidic (born 1987), a French professional football player
 Jérémy Pouge (born 1980), a French rower
Jérémy Roy (cyclist) (born 1983), French road bicycle racer 
Jérémy Roy (ice hockey) (born 1997), Canadian ice hockey defenceman
 Jérémy Sapina (born 1985), a French football player
 Jérémy Serwy (born 1991), a professional football player
 Jérémy Sopalski (born 1981), a French football player
 Jérémy Sorbon (born 1983), a French football player
 Jérémy Spender (born 1982), a French former football player
 Jérémy Stinat (born 1978), a French professional football player
 Jérémy Stravius (born 1988), a French swimmer
 Jérémy Taravel (born 1987), a French football player
 Jérémy Toulalan (born 1983), a French football player

See also
Jeremy (given name)
Jérémie (given name)

French masculine given names